Dantone is a surname. Notable people with the surname include:

Joseph J. Dantone (born 1942), U.S. Navy official
Ottavio Dantone (born 1960), Italian conductor and keyboardist

See also
D'Antoni